Cleanhead or Clean head may refer to:

 Clean Head, a 2010 EP by the band Oceana
 Elmore James, an American blues guitarist, singer, songwriter and bandleader
 Eddie Vinson, an American saxophonist and blues shouter